The Stock Market Game is a board game published by Avalon Hill in 1970.

Gameplay
The Stock Market Game is an economic strategy game involving negotiation.

Reviews
Games & Puzzles
Moves(p18)

References

External links
 

Avalon Hill games
Board games introduced in 1970